Ross Archipelago is a name for that group of islands which, together with the ice shelf between them, forms the eastern and southern boundaries of McMurdo Sound in Antarctica. The most northerly is Beaufort Island, then comes Ross Island, the Dellbridge Islands, and Black Island and White Island. Frank Debenham's classic report, The Physiography of the Ross Archipelago, 1923, described "Brown Island" (now Brown Peninsula) as a part of the group.

See also 
 Composite Antarctic Gazetteer
 List of Antarctic and sub-Antarctic islands
 List of Antarctic islands south of 60° S
 SCAR
 Territorial claims in Antarctica

References

External links